Parasopia may refer to:
Hypsopygia nostralis, a moth
Parasopia (genus), a genus of moths in the subfamily Chrysauginae
Parasopia (Boeotia), a region of ancient Boeotia, Greece

See also
Parasopias, a town of ancient Thessaly, Greece